Munich Siemenswerke station is a Munich S-Bahn railway station on the Bayerische Oberlandbahn
main line in the borough of Obersendling. It is named after a large Siemens complex formerly located west of the station. Today, large parts of this complex have been transformed to a residential area.

References

Siemenswerke
Siemenswerke